Kurt Kurz (30 September 1927 – 19 October 2013) was an Austrian ice hockey player. He competed in the men's tournament at the 1956 Winter Olympics.

References

1927 births
2013 deaths
Olympic ice hockey players of Austria
Ice hockey players at the 1956 Winter Olympics
Ice hockey people from Vienna